Antonio Ferri (5 April 1912 – 28 December 1975) was an Italian scientist, prominent in the field of aerodynamics, with a specialization in hypersonic and supersonic flight.

Born in 1912 in Norcia, Italy, from 1937 he conducted research in Guidonia Montecelio, where the most prominent and advanced research on high-speed aerodynamics was taking place. In 1938, at the age of 26, he received Italy's highest prize for science, the Premio dell'Accademia d'Italia for science. Among the work he conducted there were spectacular experiments in 1939–1940 with supersonic wind tunnels.

During World War II, in the period of the Italian Social Republic (or Salò Republic), three days after the Germans occupied Rome on 10 September 1943, Ferri bluffed his way back into the research facility at Guidonia, destroyed the vital equipment and filled a fruit crate with documents of his research before escaping underground.  
He secluded his wife and family near his home in Fiastra, in the Marche region of the Apennine Mountains (they later were moved on to an Adriatic fishing village), and in October 1943, organized with his brother, Giuseppe Ferri, the Banda Fiastra band of partisans.
For the next year he coordinated attacks of the regions anti-fascist bands using the Valle del Fiastrone [Fiastra Valley] as a safe haven to return to and to receive Allied air drops.

He eventually made his way to Rome after it was liberated by the Allies, where he made contact with OSS agent Moe Berg and began to work with him translating key documents from the trunk, also passing on his knowledge of the achievements of German science during the war.

The facilities at Guidonia were destroyed in the course of the fighting. In 1944, Ferri was brought to the leading American research center in his field, the National Advisory Committee for Aeronautics in Langley, Virginia, where he continued as a major figure in his field.

In the immediate postwar period, he studied the use of a biconvex wing profile for high-speed aircraft and developed the Schlieren Flow Visualization method of predicting the impact of shock waves on aircraft wings. He then turned at length to the problem of atmospheric reentry, hypersonic thermofluid dynamics, as applied to the study of supersonic and hypersonic jet engines. He also conducted important studies in the fields of supersonic combustion and aerodynamic heating of high speed aircraft. In all these areas, he made key contributions to the advancement of aerospace engineering.
In 1956 he founded the General Applied Science Laboratory.

Ferri died in 1975 on Long Island, New York, United States.

References 
 

5. Giuseppe Ciampaglia, Come ebbe effettivo inizio a Roma l'Operazione Paperclip (Strenna dei Romanisti 2005), Roma, RomaAmor, 2005
6. Giuseppe Ciampaglia, La Propulsione a Reazione in Italia dalle Origini al 1943, Roma, Ufficio Storico Aeronautica Militare Italiana, 2002.
 This article draws heavily on the article of the same name in the Italian Wikipedia.

1912 births
1975 deaths
People from Norcia
Italian aerospace engineers
Fluid dynamicists
Italian resistance movement members
Polytechnic Institute of New York University alumni
Polytechnic Institute of New York University faculty
Fellows of the American Physical Society